Jennifer Rodriguez is the former mayor of Bell Gardens, California.

Rodriguez was elected to the Bell Gardens City Council in 2003 and was the mayor in 2007–2009. She graduated from California State University Long Beach with a degree in psychology and is a former princess in the Miss Bell Gardens Court. Rodriguez was full-time social worker and director of admissions at a local healthcare facility and her hobbies include spending time with her family, walking, running, sports activities, and activities that benefit the community.

In 2015, Rodriguez confirmed her suspicions that her husband of 20 years, Gerardo “Gerry” Rodriguez.

After having missed extended periods of time from Council Meetings, on November 2, 2017, State of California Attorney General Xavier Becerra issued an opinion stating "there are substantial questions of law and fact as to whether Rodriguez was absent from all regular city council meetings for 60 days, thereby forfeiting her office under Gov. Code section 36513."*

On December 11, 2019, Superior Court of California (County of Los Angeles) Judge Gregory W. Alarcon ordered for Jennifer Rodriguez to be removed from office as she was found guilty of violating her duties as a city representative by neglecting to attend Council Meetings for at least 60 consecutive days on two occasions without a valid reason, while continuing to receive a salary and health benefits approximating $50,000 annually. Per Judge Alarcon, "Rodriguez vacated her office under Gov. section 36513...as Council member based on the number of unexcused absences accrued during the prescribed time. Under Code of Civil Procedure section 803, [the] court [found] Rodriguez violated her oath to her office by failing to attend regular, essential, and vitally important meetings in violation of Gov. Code Sec. 26513, vacating her office.

References
<https://oag.ca.gov/system/files/opinions/pdfs/17-305_1.pdf>
<https://laopinion.com/2019/12/17/corte-ordena-remover-de-su-cargo-a-concejal-por-faltar-a-su-trabajo-en-bell-gardens/>

External links
Official Bell Gardens website profile

Mayors of places in California
People from Bell Gardens, California
Living people
Women mayors of places in California
Year of birth missing (living people)
21st-century American women